Mae Ka is a village and subdistrict (tambon) in Mueang Phayao District, in Phayao Province, Thailand. As of 2005, it has a total population of 17,629 people. It is located in the south-western part of the province, not far from the border with Lampang Province. It lies along the National Road 1 (Phahon Yothin Road), and is connected by road to Phayao in the north and Luang Tai in Lampang Province in the south. The University of Phayao lies to the south of the main urban area.

Education
University of Phayao
Mahachulalongkornrajavidyalaya University Phayao Campus
Demonstration School University of Phayao (DESUP)
Ban Mae Ka School
Ban Mae Tam Noi School
Ban Huai Kein School
Ban Mae Tam Boon Yong School
Anuban Muaeng Phayao (Ban Thok Wak) School

Health
University of Phayao Medical Center and Hospital
Ban Mae Ka Health Promotion Hospital
Ban Huai Kein Health Promotion Hospital

References

Tambon of Phayao province
Populated places in Phayao province